Samaritans of Singapore (SOS) is a non denominational, non-profit suicide prevention centre. Since its establishment in 1969, SOS has developed into a professionally run and managed organisation. It adopts a holistic approach to suicide, focussing on suicide prevention, intervention and postvention.

SOS is a member of the National Council of Social Service and is supported by the Community Chest. SOS is also affiliated to American Association of Suicidology (AAS), International Association for Suicide Prevention, Befrienders Worldwide,  and International Federation of Telephonic Emergency Services (IFOTES).

Purpose
With the mission to be an available lifeline to anyone in crisis, SOS offers emotional support to people in crisis, thinking of suicide or affected by suicide. All information shared with SOS is treated as confidential and people can choose to remain anonymous.

Services
SOS provides the following services and programmes:
 Email Befriending
 24-hour hotline
 Professional Counselling
 Local Outreach to Suicide Survivors (LOSS)
 Healing Bridge, a suicide bereavement support group
 Crisis Support
 Case Consultation
 Training
 Community Outreach
 SOS Care Text

See also 
 List of voluntary welfare organisations in Singapore
 Edwin S. Shneidman

References

External links 
 

Suicide prevention
Charities based in Singapore